Streptomyces seoulensis is a bacterium species from the genus of Streptomyces which has been isolated from soil from Korea. Streptomyces seoulensis produces lipoamide dehydrogenase.

Further reading

See also 
 List of Streptomyces species

References

External links
Type strain of Streptomyces seoulensis at BacDive -  the Bacterial Diversity Metadatabase	

seoulensis
Bacteria described in 1997